Justice is a Major Arcana tarot card, numbered either VIII or XI, depending on the deck. This card is used in game playing as well as in divination.

Description 
The Justice card, as a member of the tarot deck, appears in early tarot, such as the Tarot de Marseilles. It is part of the tarot's Major Arcana, and usually follows the Chariot, as card VIII, although some decks vary from this pattern. The virtue Justice accompanies two of the other cardinal virtues in the Major Arcana: temperance and strength.

The figure on the card holds a scale made of gold in their left hand, symbolizing a balanced decision.

Interpretation

According to A. E. Waite's 1910 book Pictorial Key to the Tarot, the Justice card carries several divinatory associations:

11. JUSTICE.—Equity, rightness, probity, executive; triumph of the deserving side in law. Reversed: Law in all its departments, legal complications, bigotry, bias, excessive severity.

In astrology, the Justice card is associated with the planet Venus and Libra zodiac sign.

Numbering 

Justice is traditionally the eighth card, and Strength the eleventh, but the influential Rider–Waite–Smith deck switched the position of these two cards in order to make them better fit the astrological correspondences worked out by the Hermetic Order of the Golden Dawn, under which the eighth card is associated with Leo and the eleventh with Libra. This switch was originally suggested in the mysterious Cipher Manuscripts which formed the basis for the Golden Dawn's teachings regarding tarot and other subjects. Today many divinatory tarot decks use this numbering, particularly in the English-speaking world.

References

External links 

Major Arcana